Pedasus or Pedasos, also known as Pedasa (Πήδασα), was a small town of ancient Mysia, on the river Satnioeis. It is mentioned by Homer in the Iliad, but was deserted in the time of Strabo. Strabo (p. 584) mentions it among the towns of the Leleges, which were destroyed by Achilles. Pliny the Elder imagines that Pedasus was the same place as that which subsequently bore the name of Adramyttium; but as Homer distinctly places it on the river Satnioeis, the supposition is impossible.

Its site is unlocated.

References

Populated places in ancient Mysia
Former populated places in Turkey
Locations in the Iliad
Lost ancient cities and towns